Inga Airport  is an airport serving the town of Inga and the Inga dams in the Kongo Central Province of the Democratic Republic of the Congo.

The airport has a control tower, and is on a narrow ridge at a lower elevation than the town. An overrun to the east will drop  into the Congo River.

The Inga non-directional beacon (ident: IG) is located on the field.

See also

 Transport in the Democratic Republic of the Congo
 List of airports in the Democratic Republic of the Congo

References

External links
 FallingRain - Inga Airport
 SkyVector - Inga Airport
 OpenStreetMap - Inga
 OurAirports - Inga
 

Airports in Kongo Central Province